Michael Falvey (1 April 1917 – 20 December 2006) was a Gaelic footballer who played with the Dublin county team. Despite being from Dingle, County Kerry, Falvey won the All-Ireland Senior Football Championship as a Dublin player in 1942 in a final against Galway. Falvey played with Civil Service in 1944 when they won the Dublin Senior Football Championship and was denied a second title when Civil Service were defeated by Parnells in 1945. Michael attended secondary school at CBS Dingle. Mick Falvey died following a short illness in the Mater Hospital on Wednesday, 20 December 2006.

References

External link
 Mick Falvey's death

1917 births
2006 deaths
Civil Service Gaelic footballers
Dublin inter-county Gaelic footballers
Gaelic football managers
People from Dingle